Thelma Louise Mandrell (born July 13, 1954) is an American country music singer. She is the younger sister of fellow country singer Barbara Mandrell, and older sister of actress Irlene Mandrell. Louise had a successful singing career in country music from the 1970s, with a string of hits during the 1980s.

Early life
Thelma Louise Mandrell was born in 1954, to Mary Ellen (née McGill; born 1931) and Irby Matthew Mandrell (October 11, 1924 – March 5, 2009) in Corpus Christi, Texas, United States. She is the second of three daughters. Sister Barbara is five and a half years older; sister Irlene is one and a half years younger. Her mother, Mary, was a homemaker and musician hailing from rural Wayne County, Illinois. Her father Irby was a World War II naval veteran and Texas police officer from Garland County, Arkansas. Irby Mandrell was an accomplished musician and entrepreneur as well. He used his impeccable social skills and knowledge of the music industry to manage all three of his daughters' careers for over three decades.

Although Louise Mandrell never developed the scale of fan base or the worldwide recognition that her older sister Barbara gained in country music, she is still credited as one of country music's more successful female vocalists of the 1980s. With their parents coming from a musical background, Barbara started off working as a singer, and playing the steel guitar and other instruments, and toured with Patsy Cline in the early 1960s. Mandrell learned to play the guitar and bass. Soon, their parents founded the Mandrell Family Band, which toured the United States and Asia.

Barbara's professional recognition in country music in the early 1970s with hits like "Treat Him Right", "Show Me" and "The Midnight Oil" gave Louise opportunities at success.  She started performing in Barbara's band The DoRites in 1969. Her first time in the studio was on the recording "Always Wanting You", a no. 1 hit for Haggard in 1975. In 1978, she signed with Epic Records.

Music career
Mandrell released her first single in 1978, called "Put It On Me", which appeared in the Billboard country music singles chart. In 1979, she released her next single, a cover version of "Everlasting Love", another minor country hit. She started singing duets with her husband R.C. Bannon, such as "I Thought You'd Never Ask," which entered the top 50, and a cover of the number 1 song by Peaches & Herb, "Reunited", which went to number 13, her first significant hit. In 1980, following two more solo efforts that did not see the same success, she joined sisters Barbara and Irlene on the TV variety show Barbara Mandrell and the Mandrell Sisters. This show showcased not only her singing, but her multi-instrumental and comedy talents as well. In 1981, she signed with RCA Records. In 1982, Mandrell had two top 40 hits, as well as the top 20 hit "Some of My Best Friends Are Old Songs".

1983 turned out to be her most successful year.  She entered the top 15 with "Runaway Heart," and had the two top 10 hits "Save Me" (originally recorded by Northern Irish singer Clodagh Rodgers) and "Too Hot to Sleep". In 1984, Mandrell had two other Top 40 hits, "Goodbye Heartache" and "I'm Not Through Loving You Yet," and in 1985 the song "I Wanna Say Yes" entered the top 5.

In 1985, RCA released her first video for the hit single "Some Girls Have All The Luck".

Mandrell's last studio album Dreamin was released in 1987, with the single "I Wanna Hear It from Your Lips" and having her last top 40 hit with the single "Do I Have To Say Goodbye". Her last charted single came in 1988, a cover of the song "As Long As We Got Each Other", a duet with Eric Carmen.

RCA dropped Mandrell in 1988. During the 1990s, she released the videos and songs "Jean Paul" and "Down Home Christmas".

She was named the official 'Sweetheart of Tennessee.'

She was the unanimous choice of 50 Tennessee city managers -- the first time the city manager's association has so honored anyone. Miss Mandrell accepted 50 inscribed crimson hearts from the managers and in return entertained them with a few tunes. She also was named 1981's 'Yellow Rose of Texas' by the Texas state legislature, another first

Personal life
Her marriage to Ronald Shaw on July 1, 1971, ended in divorce in 1973.  She subsequently married Gary Lamar Buck of the country music group The Four Guys on July 23, 1975. They divorced in 1978.

In 1978, Mandrell met R.C. Bannon.  They married on February 26, 1979. He co-wrote songs for Barbara. "One of a Kind Pair of Fools" is a 1983 single written by Bannon and John Bettis and recorded by Barbara Mandrell.  "Only One Love in My Life," written by R.C. Bannon and John Bettis, was Ronnie Milsap's 10th number 1.

Mandrell and Bannon adopted Nicole Mandrell Shipley in 1986.  The couple divorced in 1991 and she married, for a fourth time, to John Haywood on July 16, 1993.

She became a grandmother for the first time in 2013.

Theater and writing
After leaving RCA Records, Mandrell continued to perform. In 1991, TNN began re-airing Barbara Mandrell and the Mandrell Sisters.

From 1992 to 1994, she headlined at the 4,000 seat Grand Palace Theatre in Branson, Missouri along with Kenny Rogers. On occasion, she shared the stage with Barbara, Sawyer Brown, Roger Miller, Waylon Jennings, and several other well-known country and pop music entertainers at The Grand Palace.

On September 12, 1997, Mandrell opened her own 1,400-seat theater, The Louise Mandrell Theater in Pigeon Forge, Tennessee, in the heart of the Smoky Mountains in Tennessee, alongside other theaters such as Lee Greenwood's. Mandrell appeared in every performance there and encompassed numerous musical styles, including country, jazz, and big band. It was considered the most attended (non-dinner) show in the Smoky Mountains. The Triumphant Quartet, formerly known as the Integrity Quartet, was the in-house Southern gospel group and back-up singers for Louise. The Louise Mandrell Theater had its last performance, to a sold-out house, on December 31, 2005. Mandrell sold the theater afterwards and it has changed hands twice since. The theater is now home to the "Smoky Mountain Opry."

In 1983, Mandrell co-wrote The Mandrell Family Album with writer Ace Collins. Later, they produced a series of children's books.

In 2012, she performed the title role of "Calamity Jane" at Roger Rocka's Dinner Theatre in Fresno, California through September 16, 2012. Mandrell reprised her role from July until September 15, 2019.

Later career
Mandrell continues to perform at selected special occasions and corporate events. In December 2007, she performed in Washington, D.C., with the National Army band.

Over the Christmas and New Year 2008–2009, Mandrell performed at the Opryland Hotel in Nashville for one month. The multi-instrumental dinner show was entitled "Joy to the World". Mandrell also announced her intention to create a new show in 2010, "The Gift".

In 2009, she signed with Strouadavarious Records and announced her intention to release an album of country classics and a Christmas-themed album.

During 2011 and 2012, Mandrell joined Lee Greenwood on selected tour dates, including a six-week Branson run at the Welk Resort Theatre from September 12 – October 22.

Mandrell's final Christmas show at Gaylord Opryland titled "Louise Mandrell's Christmas Dinner Party" took place November 18 – December 25, 2011.

After 30 years, she released Playing Favorites, her 11th studio album of country standards on October 4, 2019.

Mandrell appeared on the Opry's country classic show in Nashville. The last time she performed on that stage was 50 years ago. the show was broadcast live on the radio program, Opry Country Classics at the Ryman Auditorium, October 3, 2019. She is scheduled to perform on the Grand Ole Opry live from the Ryman on November 30, 2019.

2022 Louise and Irlene join the special Opry show on 7/30/2022 for the 50th year membership of sister Barbara Mandrell as a Opry member. Louise once again took to the Opry stage in the Country classics segment 10/13/2022.

Commercial spokesperson
Mandrell was the spokesperson for Sanderson Farms' Miss Goldy's Chicken for 20 years, RC Cola in the early 80's and White Rain in the mid-1980s. 2021-22 Louise, along with Jimmy Fortune, (of the Statler bros) filmed a series of infomercials for TIME LIFE. These can be seen randomly on different networks through out the country and online (Youtube).

Pop culture
In the 80's the Mandrell sisters were impersonated by the cast of Saturday Night Live on NBC. 
In 2007 Pam Tillis (country singer) released a song called "Band in the window" in the song she references Louise Mandrell. ("her name is Louise but not Mandrell, she has 80's hair and fringe")
2019 Canadian country artist Lisa Brokop released a video titled "who's gonna fill their heels" also references the Mandrell sisters.

Television appearances
 Louise Mandrell appeared in the following TV shows:
Super stars and their moms
Happy New Year 1985 w/Andy Williams Host
The Mike Douglas Show
The Today Show
700 club
CNN
Branson Country Christmas
Bright Lights and Country Nights
Pop! Goes the Country 1977-78-79*
Battle of the Network Stars X 1981
Barbara Mandrell and the Mandrell Sisters 1980–1982
Hollywood Squares
Austin City Limits 1985
Hee Haw 1980-82-87-89-90-91 +
The Tonight Show 1983–87
Crook & Chase  most recently 2009 +
Children's Miracle Network
Lifestyles of the rich and famous
Another World 1983
Crazy Like a Fox 1986
Vicki Lawrence Show
Miller and Company (Dan Miller)
Prime Time Country +
American Almanac with Willard Scott 1995
Nashville Now +
Louise Mandrell: Diamonds, Gold and Platinum (TV special 1983)
Barbara Mandrell Christmas 1986
New Country 1987
Country Music Spot Light 1994
Music City News Awards guest and host
Mike Hammer 1987
Nashville on the road
ACM Awards *
CMA Awards *
Lee Ann Womack Christmas Special 2003
The New Hollywood Squares 1987
This Is Your Life 1987
Superstars and Their Moms
American Revolutions: Country Comedy 2005
Intimate Portrait 1999
Family Feud
Grand Ole Opry *
The Tommy Hunter Show Canada
The Geraldo Rivera Show
The Oprah Winfrey Show *
Merry Christmas From the Grand Ole Opry
Branson Country Christmas
Jerry Reed and Friends 1983
Louise Mandrell & Friends Salute the Boy Scouts
Hee Haw 20th Anniversary Show
Funny Business With Charlie Chase (11/06/91)
Christmas in Hollywood
CBS' Happy New Year America 1984 & 1985
Solid Gold 1985
Barbara Mandrell: Country's Do-Right Woman (TV special)
National Easter Seal Telethon 1990
Ralph Emery 2009
Mike Huckabee show 2019
Mr Nashville (Larry Ferguson) Web 2020
Jerry Lewis telethon
+ was a guest many times

Discography
Studio albums
{| class="wikitable plainrowheaders" style="text-align:center;"
|-
! rowspan="2" style="width:20em;"| Title
! rowspan="2" style="width:16em;"| Details
! Peakpositions
|- style="font-size:smaller;"
! width="50"| US Country
|-
! scope="row"| Close Up
|
 Release date: February 1983
 Label: RCA Records
 Formats: LP, cassette
| 30
|-
! scope="row"| Too Hot to Sleep
|
 Release date: August 1983
 Label: RCA Records
 Formats: LP, cassette, CD
| 26
|-
! scope="row"| I'm Not Through Loving You Yet
|
 Release date: May 1984
 Label: RCA Records
 Formats: LP, cassette
| 54
|-
! scope="row"| Maybe My Baby
|
 Release date: May 1985
 Label: RCA Records
 Formats: LP, cassette, CD
| 60
|-
! scope="row"| Dreamin'''
|
 Release date: 1987
 Label: RCA Records
 Formats: LP, cassette
| —
|-
! scope="row"| Winter Wonderland|
 Release date: 1997
 Label: Mandrell, inc.
 Formats: CD, cassette
| —
|-
! scope="row"| Personal|
 Release date: 1998
 Label: Mandrell, Inc.
 Formats: CD, cassette
| —
|-
! scope="row"| Playing Favorites|
 Release date: October 4, 2019
 Label: Time–Life
 Formats: CD, digital download
| —
|-

|}

Albums with R. C. Bannon

Compilations

Singles
{| class="wikitable plainrowheaders" style="text-align:center;"
|-
! rowspan="2"| Year
! rowspan="2" style="width:23em;"| Single
! colspan="2"| Peak chartpositions
! rowspan="2"| Album
|- style="font-size:smaller;"
! width="40"| US Country
! width="40"| CAN Country
|-
| 1978
! scope="row"| "Put It on Me"
| 77
| —
| align="left" rowspan="6"| Louise Mandrell|-
| rowspan="2"| 1979
! scope="row"| "Everlasting Love"
| 69
| —
|-
! scope="row"| "I Never Loved Anyone Like I Loved You"
| 72
| —
|-
| rowspan="3"| 1980
! scope="row"| "Wake Me Up"
| 63
| —
|-
! scope="row"| "Beggin' for Mercy"
| 82
| —
|-
! scope="row"| "Love Insurance"
| 61
| —
|-
| rowspan="3"| 1982
! scope="row"| "(You Sure Know Your Way) Around My Heart"
| 35
| 40
| align="left"| Me and My R. C.|-
! scope="row"| "Some of My Best Friends Are Old Songs"
| 20
| 39
| align="left" rowspan="2"| You're My Super Woman, You're My Incredible Man|-
! scope="row"| "Romance"
| 22
| 35
|-
| rowspan="3"| 1983
! scope="row"| "Save Me"
| 6
| 2
| align="left"| Close Up|-
! scope="row"| "Too Hot to Sleep"
| 10
| 26
| align="left" rowspan="2"| Too Hot to Sleep|-
! scope="row"| "Runaway Heart"
| 13
| 10
|-
| rowspan="3"| 1984
! scope="row"| "I'm Not Through Loving You Yet"
| 7
| 8
| align="left" rowspan="3"| I'm Not Through Loving You Yet|-
! scope="row"| "Goodbye Heartache"
| 24
| 29
|-
! scope="row"| "This Bed's Not Big Enough"
| 52
| —
|-
| rowspan="3"| 1985
! scope="row"| "Maybe My Baby"
| 8
| 23
| align="left" rowspan="3"| Maybe My Baby|-
! scope="row"| "I Wanna Say Yes"
| 5
| 3
|-
! scope="row"| "Some Girls Have All the Luck"
| 22
| 37
|-
| 1986
! scope="row"| "I Wanna Hear It from Your Lips"
| 35
| 41
| align="left" rowspan="3"| Dreamin
|-
| rowspan="2"| 1987
! scope="row"| "Do I Have to Say Goodbye"
| 28
| 57
|-
! scope="row"| "Tender Time"
| 74
| —
|-
| 1988
! scope="row"| "As Long As We Got Each Other" (with Eric Carmen)
| 51
| —
| align="left"| The Best of Louise Mandrell|-
| 1991
! scope="row"| "Jean Paul"
| —
| —
| 
|-
| colspan="5" style="font-size:8pt"| "—" denotes releases that did not chart
|}

Singles with R. C. Bannon

Music videos

References

Bibliography
 Bufwack, Mary A. (1998). "Louise Mandrell". In The Encyclopedia of Country Music''. Paul Kingsbury, Editor. New York: Oxford University Press. p. 324.

External links
 Louise Mandrell's official website
 

1954 births
Living people
American country singer-songwriters
American women country singers
People from Corpus Christi, Texas
RCA Records Nashville artists
Singer-songwriters from Texas
Country musicians from Texas
21st-century American women